E. Miller (full name and dates of birth and death unknown) was an English cricketer.  Miller was a left-handed batsman who bowled left-arm fast.

Miller made a single first-class cricket appearance for Sussex County Cricket Club against Kent at the County Ground, Hove in 1878. In Sussex's first-innings, he was dismissed for a single run by Charles Cunliffe. In their second-innings, he was dismissed for the same score by George Hearne. In Kent's first-innings, Miller bowled five wicketless overs. This was his only major appearance for Sussex.

References

External links

English cricketers
Sussex cricketers